Ownby is a surname. Notable people with the surname include:

 Brian Ownby (born 1990), American soccer player
 Dan Ownby (born 1968), American Scout volunteer
 James P. Ownby (1845–1906), American politician and farmer